Dolly Darling is a Pakistani sitcom series produced by Abdullah Kadwani and Asad Qureshi under 7th Sky Entertainment. It features Nadia Khan, Aijaz Aslam, Uroosa Siddiqui, and Ali Rizvi in pivotal roles.

Synopsis 
Dolly Darling revolves around Dolly, a drama queen and an extrovert woman who lives with her husband who is an ad director but is completely different in nature. Dolly's extravagant and bubbling personality bothers her husband all the time and he keeps on finding ways to avoid her. Dolly, being obsessively in love with her husband, makes him uncomfortable in certain situations. While every time Dolly goes an extra mile to get her husband's attention and love somehow she fails to make an impression on him. Dolly eventually makes a plan to become a real-life heroine, Dolly Darling, for her husband to win him over.

Will Dolly ever succeed in her plan to impress her husband?

Cast

Main Cast
Nadia Khan as Dolly
Aijaz Aslam as Mustaqeem
Uroosa Siddiqui as Bemisaal
Ali Rizvi as Andesha

Recurring Cast
Jia Ali as Love Guru
Paras Masroor as Shahrukh
Ismail Tara as Mehmood
Rashid Farooqui as Namkeen
Mizna Waqas as Rabia; Beautician/Pinky's fake mother
Sami Khan as Junior
Fareeha Jabeen as Inspector Dareena
Shehnaz Pervaiz as Pammi Aunty / Dolly's mother
Hareem Farooq (Eid special episode, for the promotion of her film Heer Maan Ja)
Ali Rehman Khan (Eid special episode, for the promotion of his film Heer Maan Ja)
Shameen Khan
Maham Amir as Mano (Dolly's friend)
Kashif Mehmood as Uncle
Faryal Mehmood as Pinky
Ahmed Hassan as Jawad (Mano's Husband)
Syed Sharjeel Mehmood as Kekra Sahab
Adla Khan as Mansooba
Asim Mehmood as Munasib
Arooba Mirza as Nisha
Raza Zaidi as Chuchu
Srha Asghar as Sofia
Ali Anwar as Tahir
Irfan Motiwala as Mamu
Hira Hussain
Amir Qureshi
Farah Nadir as Inspector Zareena
Sonia Rao as Inspector Parveen Chitti
Humaira Bano as Dolly's friend mother	
Faria Sheikh as Rani
Jinaan Hussain as Bride
Namrah Shahid
Ayaz Samoo as Chintu

Soundtrack 
The original soundtrack of Dolly Darling was sung and composed by Faakhir Mehmood while the lyrics are by S. K. Khalish.

References

External links
Official website

2019 Pakistani television series debuts
Geo TV original programming
Pakistani drama television series